Joseph-Claude Drevon (29 September 1747 - 14 November 1823) was a French politician. He served as a member of the National Constituent Assembly from 3 November 1789 to 30 September 1791, the National Convention from 4 September 1792 to 5 September 1792, and the Council of Five Hundred from 23 March 1799 au 26 December 1799, representing Marne.

References

1747 births
1823 deaths
Politicians from Lyon
People from Marne (department)
Members of the Council of Five Hundred